The following is a list of ecoregions in Hungary as identified by the World Wide Fund for Nature (WWF).

Terrestrial 
Hungary is in the Palearctic realm. The country lies within one terrestrial ecoregion:
 Pannonian mixed forests.

Freshwater 
According to the Freshwater Ecoregions Of the World Hungary is covered by the following ecoregions:
 Upper Danube ecoregion
 Dniester-Lower Danube ecoregion

References 

Hungary
Biota of Hungary
ecoregions
Ecoregions